Frank Jordan  (born 1935) is an American politician who served as the 40th mayor of San Francisco, California.

Frank Jordan may also refer to:

Frank Jordan (cricketer) (1905–1995)
Frank Jordan (footballer) (1883–1938)
Frank Jordan (water polo)  (1932–2012)
Frank C. Jordan (died 1940), 20th Secretary of State of California
Frank M. Jordan (1888–1970), 22nd Secretary of State of California
 Frank Jordan (American football) (1897–1980), American football player